General Pedro Alejandrino Florentino (Hincha, 1805/1808– ?) was an officer in the army of the Dominican Republic during the struggle to restore Dominican independence from Haiti. He was the hero of the important Battle of Jacuba. Haiti had ruled the country from 1822 through 1844 when independence was declared by the "Trinitarians Duarte, Sánchez and Mella".

See also
History of the Dominican Republic
List of people from the Dominican Republic

1800s births
1860s deaths
Dominican Republic revolutionaries 
Dominican Republic military personnel
Dominican Republic people of Italian descent
Dominican Republic independence activists
People of the Dominican War of Independence
People of the Dominican Restoration War
People from Hinche